Atrachea ochrotica is a moth of the family Noctuidae first described by George Hampson in 1910. It is found in Taiwan and the Chinese province of Yunnan.

References

Moths described in 1910
Acronictinae